The International Brain Mapping and Intraoperative Surgical Planning Society (IBMISPS-Tax ID 20-2793206) DBA The Society for Brain Mapping and Therapeutics (SBMT) is a non-profit biomedical association (501c6) principally concerned with Brain Mapping and Intra-operative Surgical planning. International Brain Mapping and Intraoperative Surgical planning Foundation (IBMISPF) DBA The Brain Mapping Foundation provides funding to members of the society.

In 2013 SBMT Board and Members defined Brain Mapping as the study of the anatomy and function of the brain and spinal cord through the use of imaging (including intra-operative, microscopic, endoscopic and multi-modality imaging), immunohistochemistry, molecular & optogenetics, stem cell and cellular biology, engineering (material, electrical and biomedical), neurophysiology and nanotechnology.

History 

The Society for Brain Mapping and Therapeutics (SBMT) was founded in 2004 to break boundaries in healthcare. The society promotes policies that support rapid, safe, and cost-effective translation of new technology into medicine. SBMT played a significant role in the formulation, planning and execution of Obama's BRAIN Initiative and in 2013 pioneered the G20+ World Brain Mapping & Therapeutic Initiative, which is aimed at creating a global consortium focusing on integration of nanotechnology, imaging, cellular/stem cell therapeutics, Information Technology (IT) and devices (this approach called NanoBioElectronics) in Brain Mapping.

Collaborating partners also include: Australian Government and Australian Bio Tech (collections of 650 Australasia biotech firms), Canadian government and scientists, Turkish scientists, more than 200 universities and research institutions across the world. Man of the US Government Agencies. SBMT has near 3000 contacts with the industry around the globe.

Executive Board

Board Members  
Board appointments is one year with possibility of extension depending on how active the member is.

Previous conferences

 2004 (15 Nov) Keck School of Medicine, USC
 2005 (17–19 Nov) Pasadena, CA, USA
 2006 (5–8 Sep) Clermont Ferrand, France
 2007 (6–8 Sep) Washington DC, USA
 2008 (26–29 Aug) Los Angeles, CA, USA
 2009 (26–29 Aug) Harvard Medical School, Boston, USA
 2010 (24-27 May)  Uniformed Services University of the Health Sciences, Bethesda, USA
 2011 (8-10 Jun) Mission Bay Conference Center, San Francisco, CA, USA
 2012 (2-4 Jun) Metro Toronto Conference Center, Toronto, ON, Canada
 2013 (12-14 May) Baltimore Convention Center, Baltimore, MD, USA
 2014 (17-19 Mar) Four Seasons Hotel, Sydney, Australia
 2015 (6-8 Mar) L.A. Convention Center, Los Angeles, CA, USA 
 2016 (8-10 April) Miami Convention Center, Miami, FL, USA 
 2017 (18-20 April) Millennium Biltmore Hotel, Los Angeles, CA, USA

References

External links
 

Organizations established in 2004